George Buff (23 November 1874 – 3 March 1955) was a Dutch long-distance runner. He competed in the men's marathon at the 1908 Summer Olympics.

References

1874 births
1955 deaths
Athletes (track and field) at the 1908 Summer Olympics
Dutch male long-distance runners
Dutch male marathon runners
Olympic athletes of the Netherlands
Place of birth missing
20th-century Dutch people